The following units and commanders fought in the Battle of Trevilian Station of the American Civil War on the Confederate side. The Union order of battle is shown separately. Order of battle compiled from the corps organization during the battle, from the casualty returns and the reports.

Abbreviations used

Military rank
 MG = Major General
 BG = Brigadier General
 Col = Colonel
 Ltc = Lieutenant Colonel
 Maj = Major
 Cpt = Captain
 Lt = Lieutenant

Other
 (w) = wounded
 (k) = killed in action
 (c) = captured

Army of Northern Virginia

Cavalry Corps

MG Wade Hampton

Notes

References
 U.S. War Department, The War of the Rebellion: a Compilation of the Official Records of the Union and Confederate Armies. Washington, DC: U.S. Government Printing Office, 1880–1901.
 Wittenberg, Eric J. Glory Enough For All: Sheridan's Second Raid and the Battle of Trevilian Station. Washington, DC: Brassey's, Inc., 2001. .

American Civil War orders of battle